Rail transport in Greece has a history which began in 1869, with the completion of the then Athens & Piraeus Railway. From the 1880s to the 1920s, the majority of the network was built, reaching its heyday in 1940. From the 1950s onward, the railway system entered a period of decline, culminating in the service cuts of 2011. Ever since the 1990s, the network has been steadily modernized, but still remains smaller than its peak length. The operation of the Greek railway network is split between the Hellenic Railways Organisation (OSE), which owns and maintains the rail infrastructure; GAIAOSE, which owns the building infrastructure (including stations) and the former OSE rolling stock, Hellenic Train; and other private companies that run the trains on the network. Greece is a member of the International Union of Railways (UIC). The UIC Country Code for Greece is 73.

History

Ancient Greece
The Diolkos was a paved trackway near Corinth in Ancient Greece which enabled boats to be moved overland across the Isthmus of Corinth. The shortcut allowed ancient vessels to avoid the dangerous circumnavigation of the Peloponnese peninsula. It is regarded by the British historian of science M.J.T. Lewis, author of Early Wooden Railways, as the first railway (as defined as a track to direct vehicles so they may not leave the track) to ever be constructed.

The beginnings (1868–1919)

Greek independence in 1832 coincided with the start of the railway era. By 1835 plans were being put to the Greek state to construct a railway line from Athens to the port of Piraeus. Twenty-two years later, in 1857, a contract for its construction was signed and the work commenced.

Greece towards the end of the 19th century was a collection of small agricultural towns acting as marketplaces and economic centres for the villages that surrounded them.  Greece had very little industry and few roads, which made the government think about the development of a railway system that would go towards addressing the lack of internal and external communication that existed. In 1881 the Prime Minister, Alexandros Koumoundouros signed four contracts for the laying of  lines, with the intention of making Greece a pivotal point on the journey between Europe, India and Asia.

In the following year, 1882, Koumoundouros was replaced by Charilaos Trikoupis as Prime Minister, who cancelled the contracts, replacing them with four of his own. He had a different political vision for the railways, seeing them as a way of stimulating the internal growth of Greece and proposed a  narrow-gauge system encircling the northern Peloponnese, with a separate system in Thessaly; linking the port of Volos with the town of Kalambaka on the other side of the Thessalian plain. The network took 25 years to complete, 20 years longer than the 5 anticipated by Trikoupis.

Railway companies that arose during this era include: SPAP (Piraeus – Athens – Peloponnese Railways), which operated the system in the Peloponnese, the Thessaly Railways, which operated the lines in Thessaly, the Attica Railways, which operated the railways in Attica and the Railways of Northwest Greece, which operated the railways in Aetolia-Acarnania. 

By 1909,  of track had been laid, including the main standard-gauge line to the then Greek-Turkish border at Papapouli, past the Tempi valley (400 km north of Athens).  The first trains to run the full 506 kilometres from Athens to Thessaloniki on standard-gauge track marked the completion of the line in 1918, which by then was running entirely on Greek territory.

Integration of networks (1920–1970)
During the 1920s the Greek railway network was split between a number of companies – private and public – with the most important being the SPAP (Athens – Piraeus – Peloponnese Railways) and the SEK (Hellenic State Railways). Eventually the SPAP integrated most railways Southern Greece and the SEK those in Northern Greece. Due to the immense financial and social pressure during the interwar period not much railway construction happened. Important construction projects in the 1920s and 1930s include the expansion of the Piraeus-Thissio Railway towards the centre of Athens via a long tunnel, the attempted extension of the Palaiofarsalos – Kalampaka Railway towards Grevena and Kozani and the construction of the Leukothea – Amphipolis railway line. Much of the railway infrastructure was destroyed during the Second World War and the subsequent Civil War resulting in much of the post-war era being devoted into rebuilding it. The only noteworthy expansion between 1940 and 1971 was the building of a new railway line connecting Larissa to Volos and the extension of the Thessaloniki – Florina railway line to Ptolemaida and Kozani. Also significant was the extension of EIS towards Kifisia by absorbing a former Attica Railway line.

Modern era (1971–present)

The Hellenic Railways Organisation (OSE) was founded in 1971, taking over from the Hellenic State Railways. Many services were cut in the 1980s, in particular the metre gauge network, only to be reinstaured during the 1990s but then to be cut again in 2011 with the debt crisis. Since then, the network of Greece's standard railways has been extensively modernised and most of them have been electrified, notably between the cities of Athens and Thessaloniki, between Athens and Kiato and in the vicinity of Athens. 

In 2016 the public passenger and freight train operator, TrainOSE, was privatized. It was sold to the Italian FSI (Ferrovie dello Stato Italiane) group, owned by the Government of Italy and train operator in the country, for 50 million euros. Moreover two new freight train operators, PEARL and Rail Cargo Logistics Goldair, have begun operations with the goal of transporting cargo between Piraeus and Central Europe.

Old Urban railways of Athens
Piraeus–Monastiraki–Iraklio–Lavrio–Kifissia

The first railway line that operated in Greece was the one connecting Athens and its port Piraeus, which opened in 1869. It ran for a distance of 8 km from the port of Piraeus to Thissio in center of Athens. It was later extended to Omonoia Square in 1895 and electrified in 1904, with the 600 V DC third rail system. From 1911 it was also possible to run through freight trains on the Piraeus Harbour Tramway using dual system electric locomotives.

Another company, Attica Railways in 1885, ran a metre-gauge suburban line from Lavrio Square to the north of Omonoia Square and to Iraklio (a northern suburb). It involved a section of street running, along the present 3 September Street, from Lavrio Square to Attiki Square, beyond which it ran on a dedicated trackbed. At Iraklio, the line forked to form two suburban branches. One went further north via Maroussi to Kifissia and Strofyli, with a freight only extension to Dionyssos marble quarries. The other branch ran eastwards to Vrilissia (at a point very near to the present Plakentias station) and then southwards to the villages Peania, Koropi, Marcopoulo, Kalyvia, Keratea, Kamariza and its terminus at the mining town of Lavrio.

In 1926, the Hellenic Electric Railways S.A. (EIS) (Ελληνικοί Ηλεκτρικοί Σίδηρόδρομοι, ΕΗΣ), a new company, created by the co-operation of Attica Railways S.A. and the English "Power Group", took over operation of the two lines Piraeus-Athens and Omonia and Attiki-Kifissia-Strofyli. In 1929 SPAP (Piraeus, Athens and Peloponnese Railways) took over the Iraklio – Lavrio branch line. The Athens terminal for Lavrio was moved from Lavrio Square to Athens Peloponnese Station. To join the Lavrio line to its network, SPAP built a connection between Agioi Anargyroi (Kato Liosia) and Iraklio (1931). The Lavrio line was eventually closed in 1957, due to political pressures from the road lobby.

The line from Attiki Square to Kifissia operated as a steam locomotive hauled railway with numerous level crossings until 1938. The line was subsequently rebuilt in electrified dual track standard gauge without level crossings, connected to the electrified Athens-Piraeus (EIS) line at Omonoia, and reopened to Kifissia in 1957. The extension to Strofyli was abandoned.

Industrial railways

A number of railway lines were constructed mainly by mining operations and by extensive industrial facilities. There were also a few temporary lines, used for the construction of major public works. Most of them were either meter gauge or  narrow gauge.

Military railways (1916–1918)
During World War I, after the collapse of Serbia, Eastern Macedonia was occupied by German and Bulgarian forces and Central and Western Macedonia by French and British troops, thus establishing the Macedonian front. The French and British troops and their Greek allies had extensive military logistics facilities in and around Thessaloniki. Supplies had to be transported to the various front line units. As World War I fronts were relatively static, it was possible to construct railway lines for this purpose. Almost all of these lines were of the Decauville system with a  narrow gauge. Some of these lines were completely isolated from existing lines while others started at mainline railway stations.

The most important such railways were the following:

 The Tasli to Stavros line at Orfanu Bay.
 The Perivolaki – Nea Zichni railway line. This 66 km long line, built by the British Army, was taken over by the Hellenic State Railways (SEK) in 1921. SEK operated this line until 1947. It was preserved on request of the Hellenic Army until 1952, when it was dismantled. The main rolling stock consisted of War Department Baldwin 4-6-0T steam locomotives.
 The Skydra (Vertekop) – Aridaia line. This 42 km long line was handed over after the war to Chemins de fer Vicinaux de Macedoine (1923), which failed to make a profit and the line was taken over by the Hellenic State Railways (SEK) in 1932. SEK closed the line in 1936.
 The Armenochori – Skotsidir line
 The Goumenitsa line
 The Dimitritsi (Gudeli) to Kopriva (Kurfali) line
 The Katerini – Dramista line, a mining line for transport of brown coal (lignite)
Some of these railway lines continued operating for scheduled passenger and freight service after the conclusion of the war, under the company  "Local Railways of Macedonia".

Current status
The running of the Greek railways is divided between the Hellenic Railways Organisation, which owns and maintains the infrastructure, and TrainOSE, and other companies which run the trains on the network.

Railway Lines in Greece 
Major rail network (standard gauge)
 The Piraeus-Platy railway (with its numerous branch lines). The line has been modernized and is now fully electrified and double tracked. It is the busiest passenger and freight line in the country. It passes through many important towns and cities in mainland Greece such as Athens, Chalkis, Thebes, Lamia, Larissa and Katerini. Used for all types of railway service. 

 The Athens Airport–Patras railway which is electrified until Kiato and doubled tracked throughout. It passes through west Attica and the northern coast of the Peloponnese. Some important cities located on the line include Eleusis, Megara, Corinth and Aigio. Used for commuter/regional services. The final section, from Aigio to Patras of the line is, as of 2020, under construction.

Minor rail network
 The Thessaloniki-Bitola railway from Platy (branching off from the Athens–Thessaloniki mainline) to Florina, which continues to form the Kozani–Amyntaio railway line.
 The Alexandroupoli-Svilengrad railway, running parallel to the Evros River and the Turkish border. Important settlements on the line include Feres, Soufli, Didimotiho, Orestiada and Nea Vyssa. Used for all types of services. 
 The standard gauge Thessaly railways (Kalambaka – Palaiofarsalos and Volos – Larissa).
The Peloponnese metre gauge railway network which is largely unused. Main railway lines ran from Athens to Patras and then from Patras to Kyparissia and Kalo Nero, Corinth to Kalamata, and Katakolo to Olympia (through Pyrgos). The only active parts of the network are the Katakolo – Olympia line and the Proastiakos Patras. 
The  narrow-gauge rack railway line from Diakofto to Kalavryta (the Diakofto–Kalavryta Railway).
The seasonal,  narrow-gauge line from Ano Lechonia to Milies (the Pelion railway)
 The Thessaloniki-Idomeni railway, which is single track and electrified. It connects the Greek railway network to that of the rest of Europe. Used only for freight services.  
 The Thessaloniki-Alexandroupoli Railway, the second longest in the country. Important settlements on the line include Kilkis, Serres, Drama, Xanthi, Komotini and Alexandroupoli. Used for all types of services (although mainly intercity).

Rail Companies in Greece
Passenger and freight train services on OSE lines are operated and provided mainly by TrainOSE S.A., (a former OSE subsidiary which is now owned by the Ferrovie dello Stato Italiane group). Moreover PEARL and Rail Cargo Logistics Goldair operate freight services between Piraeus and the rest of Europe.

Future

The Egnatia Railway is a planned railway line between Alexandroupolis and Igoumenitsa. The project includes track refurbishment and upgrades on the existing track sections of the Thessaloniki – Florina and Thessaloniki – Alexandroupolis railway lines, and brand new track between Florina and Krystallopigi, and Kozani to Igoumenitsa. The projected cost of this project is €10 billion.

A new double track, standard gauge railway between Athens and Patras is also currently under tendering process.

An expansion of the Athens Suburban Railway to Loutraki is currently underway.

Stations Gallery

Urban Railways

Athens 

Athens Metro consists of one mostly overground line (Line 1), one completely underground line (Line 2) and one mostly underground line (Line 3) serves Athens' Urban area. The system is owned by Attiko Metro S.A. and is operated by Stasy S.A. or STASY. Athens Metro trains reach Athens International Airport over electrified OSE lines that are also used by the Suburban Railway.

The Athens Suburban Railway consists of five lines running on the Athens – Oinoi – Chalkida railway, the Athens Airport – Aigio railway and the Athens – Athens International Airport railway. It is double tracked (except for the Oinoi – Chalkida line) and electrified throughout its route. 

The modern day Athens Tram was built according to Light Rail standards in 2004. It runs from Piraeus to Voula along the Athens Riviera, and also connects with Syntagma Square in the centre of Athens. It was built in standard gauge and extends a length of 32.4 km.

Thessaloniki

Proastiakos Thessalonikis is a commuter rail service consisting of two lines and serving much of the region of Macedonia. Line 1 operates from the New Railway Station to Platy and then Katerini and Larissa. Line 2 runs from the New Railway Station to Platy, Edessa and Florina. Both lines are standard gauge, and line 1 is electrified and double tracked whilst line 2 is not. 

The construction of Thessaloniki metro began in 2006 with the first phase of the project expected to be complete by 2023. The 9.6 km line will be owned and operated by Attiko Metro S.A.

Patras 
Proastiakos Patras is a commuter rail system which operates on two lines. The first one runs from the town of Kato Achaia to the Central Railway Station and the second one from the suburb of Rio to the Central Railway Station. Despite operating on the old metre gauge network and having limited infrastructure, it is considered by the public and many experts as the best commuter rail in Greece.

Thrace 

Proastiakos of Thrace was a commuter rail system which operated on 2009 until 2010. Operated from Alexandroupolis to Xanthi. Line is standard gauge. But on 3 February 2010 Proastiakos of Thace suspended.

See also
 Athens Metro
 Athens Tram
 P.A.Th.E./P.
 Budapest–Belgrade–Skopje–Athens railway
 Hellenic Railways Organisation
 List of town tramway systems in Greece
 Railway Museum of Athens
 Transport in Greece

References

Further reading

  It is the only extensive and authoritative source for the history of Greek railways until 1997.
  Contains brief history, simple line maps and extensive list of rolling stock until 1997.

 
 ERAIL Greece monograph, report submitted to the European Commission, DG Transport and Energy, Version 6, Rijswijk, The Netherlands, 2005.

External links

 OSE group
 TrainOSE S.A.

Rail transport in Greece